In Buddhism, the Four Noble Truths ("The four Arya satyas") are "the truths of the Noble Ones", the truths or realities for the "spiritually worthy ones". The truths are:
 dukkha (literally "suffering"; here "unsatisfactoriness") is an innate characteristic of existence in the realm of samsara;
samudaya (origin, arising, combination; 'cause'): dukkha arises or continues with taṇhā ("craving, desire or attachment, lit. "thirst"). While taṇhā is traditionally interpreted in western languages as the 'cause' of dukkha, tanha can also be seen as the factor tying us to dukkha, or as a response to dukkha, trying to escape it; 
nirodha (cessation, ending, confinement): dukkha can be ended or contained by the renouncement or letting go of this taṇhā;  the confinement of taṇhā releases the excessive bind of dukkha;
marga (path, Noble Eightfold Path) is the path leading to the confinement of tanha and dukkha.

The four truths appear in many grammatical forms in the ancient Buddhist texts, and are traditionally identified as the first teaching given by the Buddha. While often called one of the most important teachings in Buddhism, they have both a symbolic and a propositional function. Symbolically, they represent the awakening and liberation of the Buddha, and of the potential for his followers to reach the same liberation and freedom as him. As propositions, the Four Truths are a conceptual framework that appear in the Pali canon and early Hybrid Sanskrit Buddhist scriptures, as a part of the broader "network of teachings" (the "dhamma matrix"), which have to be taken together. They provide a conceptual framework for introducing and explaining Buddhist thought, which has to be personally understood or "experienced".

As a proposition, the four truths defy an exact definition, but refer to and express the basic orientation of Buddhism: unguarded sensory contact gives rise to craving and clinging to impermanent states and things, which are dukkha, "unsatisfactory," "incapable of satisfying" and painful.) This craving keeps us caught in saṃsāra, "wandering," usually interpreted as the endless cycle of repeated rebirth,{{refn|group=note|name="ego-rebirth|Buddhist modernism and some Theravadins have reinterpreted these teachings as "birth of ego". See, for example Payutto,<ref name="Payutto">Payutto, Dependent Origination: the Buddhist Law of Causality</ref> and Buddhist modernism#West: Naturalized Buddhism.}} and the continued dukkha that comes with it, but also referring to the endless cycle of attraction and rejection that perpetuates the ego-mind. There is a way to end this cycle, namely by attaining nirvana, cessation of craving, whereafter rebirth and the accompanying dukkha will no longer arise again. This can be accomplished by following the eightfold path, confining our automatic responses to sensory contact by restraining oneself, cultivating discipline and wholesome states, and practicing mindfulness and dhyana (meditation).

The function of the four truths, and their importance, developed over time and the Buddhist tradition slowly recognized them as the Buddha's first teaching. This tradition was established when prajna, or "liberating insight", came to be regarded as liberating in itself, instead of or in addition to the practice of dhyana. This "liberating insight" gained a prominent place in the sutras, and the four truths came to represent this liberating insight, as a part of the enlightenment story of the Buddha.

The four truths grew to be of central importance in the Theravada tradition of Buddhism by about the 5th-century CE, which holds that the insight into the four truths is liberating in itself. They are less prominent in the Mahayana tradition, which sees the higher aims of insight into sunyata, emptiness, and following the Bodhisattva path as central elements in their teachings and practice. The Mahayana tradition reinterpreted the four truths to explain how a liberated being can still be "pervasively operative in this world". Beginning with the exploration of Buddhism by western colonialists in the 19th century and the development of Buddhist modernism, they came to be often presented in the west as the central teaching of Buddhism, sometimes with novel modernistic reinterpretations very different from the historic Buddhist traditions in Asia.

The four truths

Full set – Dhammacakkappavattana Sutta
The four truths are best known from their presentation in the Dhammacakkappavattana Sutta text, which contains two sets of the four truths, while various other sets can be found in the Pāli Canon, a collection of scriptures in the Theravadan Buddhist tradition. The full set, which is most commonly used in modern expositions, contains grammatical errors, pointing to multiple sources for this set and translation problems within the ancient Buddhist community. Nevertheless, they were considered correct by the Pali tradition, which did not correct them.

According to the Buddhist tradition, the Dhammacakkappavattana Sutta, "Setting the Wheel of Dhamma in Motion", contains the first teachings that the Buddha gave after attaining full awakening, and liberation from rebirth. According to L. S. Cousins, many scholars are of the view that "this discourse was identified as the first sermon of the Buddha only at a later date," and according to professor of religion Carol S. Anderson the four truths may originally not have been part of this sutta, but were later added in some versions. Within this discourse, the four noble truths are given as follows ("bhikkus" is normally translated as "Buddhist monks"):

According to this sutra, with the complete comprehension of these four truths release from samsara, the cycle of rebirth, was attained:

The comprehension of these four truths by his audience leads to the opening of the Dhamma Eye, that is, the attainment of right vision:

Basic set
According to K.R. Norman, the basic set is as follows:
 idam dukkham, "this is pain"
 ayam dukkha-samudayo, "this is the origin of pain"
 ayam dukkha-nirodha, "this is the cessation of pain"
 ayam dukkha-nirodha-gamini patipada, "this is the path leading to the cessation of pain."  The key terms in the longer version of this expression, dukkha-nirodha-gamini Patipada, can be translated as follows:
 Gamini: leading to, making for
 Patipada: road, path, way; the means of reaching a goal or destination

Mnemonic set
According to K. R. Norman, the Pali canon contains various shortened forms of the four truths, the "mnemonic set", which were "intended to remind the hearer of the full form of the NTs." The earliest form of the mnemonic set was "dukkham samudayo nirodho magga", without the reference to the Pali terms sacca or arya, which were later added to the formula. The four mnemonic terms can be translated as follows:
 Dukkha – "incapable of satisfying", "the unsatisfactory nature and the general insecurity of all conditioned phenomena"; "painful". Dukkha is most commonly translated as "suffering". According to Khantipalo, this is an incorrect translation, since it refers to the ultimately unsatisfactory nature of temporary states and things, including pleasant but temporary experiences. According to Emmanuel, Dukkha is the opposite of sukha, "pleasure", and it is better translated as "pain".
 Samudaya – "origin", "source", "arising", "coming to existence"; "aggregate of the constituent elements or factors of any being or existence", "cluster", "coming together", "combination", "producing cause", "combination", "rising". Conjunct of:
 sam - "with, together with";
 udaya - "rising," "swelling up"; "rising up, coming forth"; "elevation, exaltation, rise; growth"; "result, consequence";
 Nirodha – cessation; release; to confine; "prevention, suppression, enclosing, restraint"
 Marga – "path".

Alternative formulations
According to L.S. Cousins, the four truths are not restricted to the well-known form where dukkha is the subject. Other forms take "the world, the arising of the world" or "the āsavas, the arising of the āsavas" as their subject. According to Cousins, "the well-known form is simply shorthand for all of the forms." "The world" refers to the saṅkhāras, that is, all compounded things, or to the six sense spheres.

The various terms all point to the same basic idea of Buddhism, as described in five skandhas and twelve nidānas. In the five skandhas, sense-contact with objects leads to sensation and perception; the saṅkhāra ('inclinations', c.q. craving etc.) determine the interpretation of, and the response to, these sensations and perceptions, and affect consciousness in specific ways. The twelve nidānas describe the further process: craving and clinging (upādāna) lead to bhava (becoming) and jāti (birth).

The aim of the Buddhist path is to reverse this causal chain: when there is no (response to) sensation, there is no craving, no karma, no rebirth. In Thai Buddhism, bhava is interpreted as behavior which serves craving and clinging, while jāti is interpreted as the repeated birth of the ego or self-sense, which perpetuates the process of self-serving responses and actions.

Truths for the noble ones
The Pali terms ariya sacca (Sanskrit: arya satya) are commonly translated as "noble truths". This translation is a convention started by the earliest translators of Buddhist texts into English. According to K.R. Norman, this is just one of several possible translations. According to Paul Williams,

The term "arya" was later added to the four truths. The term ariya (Sanskrit: arya) can be translated as "noble", "not ordinary", "valuable", "precious". "pure". Paul Williams:

The term sacca (Sanskrit: satya) is a central term in Indian thought and religion. It is typically translated as "truth"; but it also means "that which is in accord with reality", or "reality". According to Rupert Gethin, the four truths are "four 'true things' or 'realities' whose nature, we are told, the Buddha finally understood on the night of his awakening." They function as "a convenient conceptual framework for making sense of Buddhist thought." According to K. R. Norman, probably the best translation is "the truth[s] of the noble one (the Buddha)". It is a statement of how things are seen by a Buddha, how things really are when seen correctly. It is the truthful way of seeing. Through not seeing things this way, and behaving accordingly, we suffer.

Symbolic and propositional function

According to Anderson, the four truths have both a symbolic and a propositional function:

As a symbol, they refer to the possibility of awakening, as represented by the Buddha, and are of utmost importance:

As a proposition, they are part of the matrix or "network of teachings", in which they are "not particularly central", but have an equal place next to other teachings, describing how release from craving is to be reached. A long recognized feature of the Theravada canon is that it lacks an "overarching and comprehensive structure of the path to nibbana." The sutras form a network or matrix, and the four truths appear within this "network of teachings", which have to be taken together. Within this network, "the four noble truths are one doctrine among others and are not particularly central", but are a part of "the entire dhamma matrix". The four noble truths are set and learnt in that network, learning "how the various teachings intersect with each other", and refer to the various Buddhist techniques, which are all explicitly and implicitly part of the passages which refer to the four truths. According to Anderson,

Explanation of the Four Truths

Dukkha and its ending
As a proposition, the four truths defy an exact definition, but refer to and express the basic orientation of Buddhism: sensory contact gives rise to clinging and craving to temporary states and things, which is ultimately unsatisfactory, dukkha, and sustains samsara, the repeated cycle of bhava (becoming, habitual tendencies) and jāti ("birth", interpreted as either rebirth, the coming to be of a new existence; or as the arising of the sense of self as a mental phenomenon).
 
By following the Buddhist path, craving and clinging can be confined, peace of mind and real happiness
 
can be attained, and the repeated cycle of repeated becoming and birth will be stopped.

The truth of dukkha, "incapable of satisfying", "painful", from dush-stha, "standing unstable," is the basic insight that samsara, life in this "mundane world", with its clinging and craving to impermanent states and things" is dukkha, unsatisfactory and painful. We expect happiness from states and things which are impermanent, and therefore cannot attain real happiness.

The truth of samudaya, "arising", "coming together", or dukkha-samudaya, the origination or arising of dukkha, is the truth that samsara, and its associated dukkha arises, or continues, with taṇhā, "thirst", craving for and clinging to these impermanent states and things.
 In the orthodox view, this clinging and craving produces karma, which leads to renewed becoming, keeping us trapped in rebirth and renewed dissatisfaction. Craving includes kama-tanha, craving for sense-pleasures; bhava-tanha, craving to continue the cycle of life and death, including rebirth; and vibhava-tanha, craving to not experience the world and painful feelings. While dukkha-samudaya, the term in the basic set of the four truths, is traditionally translated and explained as "the origin (or cause) of suffering", giving a causal explanation of dukkha, Brazier and Batchelor point to the wider connotations of the term samudaya, "coming into existence together": together with dukkha arises tanha, thirst. Craving does not cause dukkha, but comes into existence together with dukkha, or the five skandhas. It is this craving which is to be confined, as Kondanna understood at the end of the Dhammacakkappavattana Sutta: "whatever arises ceases".

The truth of nirodha, "cessation," "suppression," "renouncing," "letting go", or dukkha-nirodha, the cessation of dukkha, is the truth that dukkha ceases, or can be confined, when one renounces or confines craving and clinging, and nirvana is attained. Alternatively, tanha itself, as a response to dukkha, is to be confined. Nirvana refers to the moment of attainment itself, and the resulting peace of mind and happiness (khlesa-nirvana), but also to the final dissolution of the five skandhas at the time of death (skandha-nirvana or parinirvana); in the Theravada-tradition, it also refers to a transcendental reality which is "known at the moment of awakening". According to Gethin, "modern Buddhist usage tends to restrict 'nirvāṇa' to the awakening experience and reserve 'parinirvāṇa' for the death experience. When nirvana is attained, no more karma is being produced, and rebirth and dissatisfaction will no longer arise again. Cessation is nirvana, "blowing out", and peace of mind. Joseph Goldstein explains:

The truth of magga, refers to the path to the cessation of, or liberation from dukkha c.q. tanha. By following the Noble Eightfold Path, to moksha, liberation, restraining oneself, cultivating discipline, and practicing mindfulness and meditation, one starts to disengage from craving and clinging to impermanent states and things, and rebirth and dissatisfaction will be ended. The term "path" is usually taken to mean the Noble Eightfold Path, but other versions of "the path" can also be found in the Nikayas. The Theravada tradition regards insight into the four truths as liberating in itself.

The well-known eightfold path consists of the understanding that this world is fleeting and unsatisfying, and how craving keeps us tied to this fleeting world; a friendly and compassionate attitude to others; a correct way of behaving; mind-control, which means not feeding on negative thoughts, and nurturing positive thoughts; constant awareness of the feelings and responses which arise; and the practice of dhyana, meditation. The tenfold path adds the right (liberating) insight, and liberation from rebirth.

The four truths are to be internalised, and understood or "experienced" personally, to turn them into a lived reality.

Ending rebirth

The four truths describe dukkha and its ending as a means to reach peace of mind in this life, but also as a means to end rebirth.

According to Geoffrey Samuel, "the Four Noble Truths [...] describe the knowledge needed to set out on the path to liberation from rebirth." By understanding the four truths, one can stop this clinging and craving, attain a pacified mind, and be freed from this cycle of rebirth and redeath. Patrick Olivelle explains that moksha is a central concept in Indian religions, and "literally means freedom from samsara." Melvin E. Spiro further explains that "desire is the cause of suffering because desire is the cause of rebirth." When desire ceases, rebirth and its accompanying suffering ceases. Peter Harvey explains:

The last sermon, the Maha-parinibbana Sutta (Last Days of the Buddha, Digha Nikaya 16)", states it as follows:

Other interpretations
According to Bhikkhu Buddhadasa, "birth" does refer not to physical birth and death, but to the birth and death of our self-concept, the "emergence of the ego". According to Buddhadhasa,

Some contemporary teachers tend to explain the four truths psychologically, by taking dukkha to mean mental anguish in addition to the physical pain of life, and interpreting the four truths as a means to attain happiness in this life. In the contemporary Vipassana movement that emerged out of the Theravada Buddhism, freedom and the "pursuit of happiness" have become the main goals, not the end of rebirth, which is hardly mentioned in their teachings.

Yet, though freedom and happiness is a part of the Buddhist teachings, these words refer to something different in traditional Asian Buddhism. According to Gil Fronsdal, "when Asian teachers do talk about freedom, it is primarily in reference to what one is free from – that is, from greed, hate, delusion, grasping, attachment, wrong view, self, and most significantly, rebirth". Nibbana is the final freedom, and it has no purpose beyond itself. In contrast, freedom in the creative modern interpretation of Four Noble Truths and the Eightfold Path means living happily and wisely, "without drastic changes in lifestyle". Such freedom and happiness is not the goal of Four Noble Truths and related doctrines within traditional Buddhism, but the vipassana teachings in the West make no reference to traditional Theravada doctrines, instead they present only the pragmatic and experiential goals in the form of therapy for the audience's current lives. The creative interpretations are driven in part because the foundational premises of Buddhism do not make sense to audiences outside of Asia. According to Spiro, "the Buddhist message is not simply a psychological message", but an eschatological message.

Historical development in early Buddhism

According to Anderson, "the four truths are recognized as perhaps the most important teaching of the Buddha." Yet, as early as 1935 Caroline Rhys Davids wrote that for a teaching so central to Theravada Buddhism, it was missing from critical passages in the Pali canon. According to Gethin, the four truths and the eightfold path are only two lists of "literally hundreds of similar lists covering the whole range of the theory and practice of ancient Buddhism." The position of the four truths within the canon raises questions, and has been investigated throughout the 19th and 20th centuries.

Scholarly analysis of the oldest texts
According to academic scholars, inconsistencies in the oldest texts may reveal developments in the oldest teachings. While the Theravada-tradition holds that the Sutta Pitaka is "the definitive recension of the Buddha-word", and Theravadins argue that it is likely that the sutras date back to the Buddha himself, in an unbroken chain of oral transmission, academic scholars have identified many such inconsistencies, and tried to explain them. Information of the oldest teachings of Buddhism, such as on the Four Noble Truths, has been obtained by analysis of the oldest texts and these inconsistencies, and are a matter of ongoing discussion and research. According to Schmithausen, three positions held by scholars of Buddhism can be distinguished regarding the possibility to retain knowledge of the oldest Buddhism:
 "Stress on the fundamental homogeneity and substantial authenticity of at least a considerable part of the Nikayic materials;"
 "Scepticism with regard to the possibility of retrieving the doctrine of earliest Buddhism;"
 "Cautious optimism in this respect."

Development

Growing importance
According to Bronkhorst, the four truths may already have been formulated in earliest Buddhism, but did not have the central place they acquired in later buddhism. According to Anderson, only by the time of the commentaries, in the fifth century CE, did the four truths come to be identified in the Theravada tradition as the central teaching of the Buddha. According to Anderson,

According to Feer and Anderson, the four truths probably entered the Sutta Pitaka from the Vinaya, the rules for monastic order. They were first added to enlightenment-stories which contain the Four Jhanas, replacing terms for "liberating insight". From there they were added to the biographical stories of the Buddha.

Substituting "liberating insight"
Scholars have noted inconsistencies in the presentations of the Buddha's enlightenment, and the Buddhist path to liberation, in the oldest sutras. They argue that these inconsistencies show that the Buddhist teachings evolved, either during the lifetime of the Buddha, or thereafter.{{refn|group=note|name="development of teachings"|See:
 La Vallee Possin (1937), Musila et Narada; reprinted in Gombrich (2006), How Buddhism Began, appendix
 Erich Frauwallner (1953), Geschichte der indischen Philosophie, Band  Der Buddha und der Jina (pp. 147–272)
 Andre Bareau (1963), Recherches sur la biographiedu Buddha dans les Sutrapitaka et les Vinayapitaka anciens, Ecole Francaise d'Extreme-Orient
 Schmithausen, On some Aspects of Descriptions or Theories of 'Liberating Insight' and 'Enlightenment' in Early Buddhism. In: Studien zum Jainismus und Buddhismus (Gedenkschrift für Ludwig Alsdorf), hrsg. von Klaus Bruhn und Albrecht Wezler, Wiesbaden 1981, 199–250.
 
 K.R. Norman, Four Noble Truths]
 
 Tilman Vetter (1988), The Ideas and Meditative Practices of Early Buddhism, by Tilmann Vetter
 , chapter four
 
 Alexander Wynne (2007), The Origin of Buddhist Meditation, Routledge}} According to the Japanese scholar Ui, the four truths are not the earliest representation of the Buddha's enlightenment. Instead, they are a rather late theory on the content of the Buddha's enlightenment. According to Vetter and Bronkhorst, the earliest Buddhist path consisted of a set of practices which culminate in the practice of dhyana, leading to a calm of mind and awareness (mindfulness) which according to Vetter is the liberation which is being sought. Later on, "liberating insight" came to be regarded as equally liberating. This "liberating insight" came to be exemplified by prajna, or the insight in the "four truths", but also by other elements of the Buddhist teachings. According to Vetter and Bronkhorst, this growing importance of "liberating insight" was a response to other religious groups in India, which held that a liberating insight was indispensable for moksha, liberation from rebirth. This change is reflected in the canon, where, according to Bronkhorst,

According to Vetter and Bonkhorst, the ideas on what exactly constituted this "liberating insight" was not fixed but developed over time. According to Bronkhorst, in earliest Buddhism the four truths did not serve as a description of "liberating insight". Initially the term prajna served to denote this "liberating insight". Later on, prajna was replaced in the suttas by the "four truths". This happened in those texts where practicing the four jhanas preceded the attainment of "liberating insight", and where this practice of the four jhanas then culminates in "liberating insight". This "liberating insight" came to be defined as "insight into the four truths", which is presented as the "liberating insight" which constituted the awakening, or "enlightenment" of the Buddha. When he understood these truths he was "enlightened" and liberated, as reflected in Majjhima Nikaya 26:42: "his taints are destroyed by his seeing with wisdom."

Bronkhorst points to an inconsistency, noting that the four truths refer here to the eightfold path as the means to gain liberation, while the attainment of insight into the four truths is portrayed as liberating in itself. According to Bronkhorst, this is an inconsistency which reveals a change which took place over time in the composition of the sutras. An example of this substitution, and its consequences, is Majjhima Nikaya 36:42–43, which gives an account of the awakening of the Buddha.

According to Schmithausen, the four truths were superseded by pratityasamutpada, and still later, in the Hinayana schools, by the doctrine of the non-existence of a substantial self or person. Schmithausen further states that still other descriptions of this "liberating insight" exist in the Buddhist canon:

In contrast, Thanissaro Bikkhu presents the view that the four truths, pratityasamutpada and anatta are inextricably intertwined.

Acquiring the dhamma-eye and destroying the āsavās
In their symbolic function, the sutras present the insight into the four truths as the culmination of the Buddha's path to awakening. In the Vinayapitaka and the Sutta-pitaka they have the same symbolic function, in a reenactment by his listeners of the Buddha's awakening by attaining the dhamma-eye. In contrast, here this insight serves as the starting point to path-entry for his audience. These sutras present a repeated sequence of events:
 Annupubbikathā ("graduated talk"), in which the Buddha explains the four truths; this talk frees the listener from the hindrances;
 This talk opens the dhammacakkhu ("dhamma eye"), and knowledge arises: "all that has the nature of arising has the nature of ending";
 The request to become a member of the Buddhist order;
 A second talk by the Buddha, which destroys the āsavās, impurities;
 The statement that "there are now x arahats in the world."

Yet, in other sutras, where the four truths have a propositional function, the comprehension of the four truths destroys the corruptions. They do so in combination with the practice of the jhanas and the attainment of the divine eye, with which past lives and the working of rebirth are being seen.

According to Anderson, following Schmithausen and Bronkhorst, these two presentations give two different models of the path to liberation, reflecting their function as a symbol and as a proposition. Most likely, the four truths were first associated with the culmination of the path in the destruction of the āsavās, where they substituted the unspecified "liberating insight"; as the canon developed, they became more logically associated with the beginning of the Buddhist path.

Popularisation in the west
According to Anderson there is a strong tendency within scholarship to present the four truths as the most essential teaching of Buddhism. According to Anderson, the four truths have been simplified and popularized in western writings, due to "the colonial project of gaining control over Buddhism." According to Crosby, the Buddhist teachings are reduced to a "simple, single rationalized account", which has parallels in the reinterpretation of the Buddha in western literature.

The presentation of the four truths as one of the most important teachings of the Buddha "has been [done] to reduce the four noble truths to a teaching that is accessible, pliable, and therefore readily appropriated by non-Buddhists." There is a great variety of teachings in the Buddhist literature, which may be bewildering for those who are unaware of this variety. The four truths are easily accessible in this regard, and are "readily [understood] by those outside the Buddhist traditions." For example Walpola Rahula's What the Buddha Taught, a widely used introductory text for non-Buddhists, uses the four truths as a framework to present an overview of the Buddhist teachings.

According to Harris, the British in the 19th century crafted new representations of Buddhism and the Buddha. 19th century missionaries studied Buddhism, to be more effective in their missionary efforts. The Buddha was de-mystified, and reduced from a "superhuman" to a "compassionate, heroic human", serving "western historical method and the missionary agenda of situating the Buddha firmly below the divine." The four truths were discovered by the British by reading the Buddhist texts, and were not immediately granted the central position they later received.

The writings of British missionaries show a growing emphasis on the four truths as being central to Buddhism, with somewhat different presentations of them. This colonial project had a strong influence on some strands of Buddhism, culminating in so-called Protestant Buddhism, which incorporated several essentially Protestant attitudes regarding religion, such as the emphasis on written texts. According to Gimello, Rahula's book is an example of this Protestant Buddhism, and "was created in an accommodating response to western expectations, and in nearly diametrical opposition to Buddhism as it had actually been practised in traditional Theravada."

Hendrik Kern proposed in 1882 that the model of the four truths may be an analogy with classical Indian medicine, in which the four truths function as a medical diagnosis, and the Buddha is presented as a physician. Kern's analogy became rather popular, but "there is not sufficient historical evidence to conclude that the Buddha deliberately drew upon a clearly defined medical model for his fourfold analysis of human pain."

According to Anderson, those scholars who did not place the four truths at the center of Buddhism, either "located the four truths in a fuller reading of the Theravada canon and the larger context of South Asian literature", or "located the teaching within an experience of Buddhism as practiced in a contemporary setting." According to Anderson, "these autors suggest a more complex reading of the four noble truths than those who locate the teaching as the key to or as a crucial element within the grand scheme of Buddhism."

Appearance within the discourses
The developing Buddhist tradition inserted the four truths, using various formulations, at various sutras. They are being used both as a symbol of all dhammas and the Buddha's awakening, and as a set of propositions which function within a matrix of teachings. According to Anderson, there is no single way to understand the teachings; one teaching may be used to explain another teaching, and vice versa. The teachings form a network, which should be apprehended as such to understand how the various teachings intersect with each other.

Symbolic function

Mahasaccaka Sutta
The Mahasaccaka Sutta ("The Greater Discourse to Saccaka", Majjhima Nikaya 36) gives one of several versions of the Buddha's way to liberation. He attains the three knowledges, namely knowledge of his former lifes, knowledge of death and rebirth, and knowledge of the destruction of the taints, the Four Noble Truths. After going through the four dhyanas, and gaining the first two knowledges, the story proceeds:

Bronkhorst dismisses the first two knowledges as later additions, and proceeds to notice that the recognition of the intoxicants is modelled on the four truths. According to Bronkhorst, those are added the bridge the original sequence of "I directed my mind to the knowledge of the destruction of the intoxicants. My mind was liberated", which was interrupted by the addition of the four truths. Bronkhorst points out that those do not fit here, since the four truths culminate in the knowledge of the path to be followed, while the Buddha himself is already liberated at that point.

Dhammacakkappavattana Sutta

According to the Buddhist tradition, the first talk of Gautama Buddha after he attained enlightenment is recorded in the Dhammacakkappavattana Sutta ("Setting in Motion the Wheel of Dhamma", Samyutta Nikaya 56.11). The Dhammacakkappavattana Sutta provides details on three stages in the understanding of each truth, for a total of twelve insights. The three stages for understanding each truth are:
 sacca-ñāṇa – knowing the nature of the truth (e.g., acknowledgement, view, reflection)
 kicca-ñāṇa – knowing what needs to be done in connection with that truth (e.g., practice; motivation; directly experiencing)
 kata-ñāṇa – accomplishing what needs to be done (e.g., result, full understanding, knowing)

These three stages of understanding are emphasized particularly in the Theravada tradition, but they are also recognized by some contemporary Mahayana teachers.

According to Cousins, many scholars are of the view that "this discourse was identified as the first sermon of the Buddha only at a later date." According to Stephen Batchelor, the Dhammacakkappavattana Sutta contains incongruities, and states that

According to Bronkhorst this "first sermon" is recorded in several sutras, with important variations. In the Vinaya texts, and in the Dhammacakkappavattana Sutta which was influenced by the Vinaya texts, the four truths are included, and Kondañña is enlightened when the "vision of Dhamma" arises in him: "whatever is subject to origination is all subject to cessation." Yet, in the Ariyapariyesanā Sutta ("The Noble Search", Majjhima Nikaya 26) the four truths are not included, and the Buddha gives the five ascetics personal instructions in turn, two or three of them, while the others go out begging for food. The versions of the "first sermon" which include the four truths, such as the Dhammacakkappavattana Sutta, omit this instruction, showing that

According to Bronkhorst, this indicates that the four truths were later added to earlier descriptions of liberation by practicing the four dhyanas, which originally was thought to be sufficient for the destruction of the arsavas. Anderson, following Norman, also thinks that the four truths originally were not part of this sutta, and were later added in some versions.

According to Bronkhorst, the "twelve insights" are probably also a later addition, born out of unease with the substitution of the general term "prajna" for the more specific "four truths".

Maha-parinibbana Sutta
According to the Buddhist tradition, the Maha-parinibbana Sutta (Last Days of the Buddha, Digha Nikaya 16) was given near the end of the Buddha's life. This sutta "gives a good general idea of the Buddha's Teaching:"

Propositional function

Maha-salayatanika Sutta
The Maha-salayatanika Sutta, Majjhima Nikaya 149:3 plus 149:9, give an alternative presentation of the four truths:

Emphasis within different traditions

Early Indian Buddhism
The Ekavyāvahārika sect emphasized the transcendence of the Buddha, asserting that he was eternally enlightened and essentially non-physical. According to the Ekavyāvahārika, the words of the Buddha were spoken with one transcendent meaning, and the Four Noble Truths are to be understood simultaneously in one moment of insight. According to the Mahīśāsaka sect, the Four Noble Truths should be meditated upon simultaneously.

Theravada

According to Carol Anderson, the four truths have "a singular position within the Theravada canon and tradition." The Theravada tradition regards insight in the four truths as liberating in itself. As Walpola Rahula states, "when the Truth is seen, all the forces which feverishly produce the continuity of samsara in illusion become calm and incapable of producing any more karma-formations [...] he is free from [...] the 'thirst' for becoming." This liberation can be attained in one single moment, when the four truths are understood together. Within the Theravada tradition, great emphasis is placed upon reading and contemplating The Discourse That Sets Turning the Wheel of Truth, and other suttas, as a means to study the four noble truths and put them into practice. For example, Ajahn Sumedho states: 

Within the Theravada-tradition, three different stances on nirvana and the question what happens with the Arhat after death can be found. Nirvana refers to the cessation of the defilements and the resulting peace of mind and happiness (khlesa-nirvana); to the final dissolution of the five skandhas at the time of death (skandha-nirvana or parinirvana); and to a transcendental reality which is "known at the moment of awakening". According to Gethin, "modern Buddhist usage tends to restrict 'nirvāṇa' to the awakening experience and reserve 'parinirvāṇa' for the death experience. According to Geisler and Amano, in the "minimal Theravada interpretation", nirvana is a psychological state, which ends with the dissolution of the body and the total extinction of existence. According to Geisler and Amano, the "orthodox Theravada interpretation" is that nirvana is a transcendent reality with which the self unites. According to Bronkhorst, while "Buddhism preached liberation in this life, i.e. before death", there was also a tendency in Buddhism to think of liberation happening after death. According to Bronkhorst, this

According to Walpola Rahula, the cessation of dukkha is nirvana, the summum bonum of Buddhism, and is attained in this life, not when one dies. Nirvana is "perfect freedom, peace, tranquility and happiness", and "Absolute Truth", which simply is. Jayatilleke also speaks of "the attainment of an ultimate reality". According to Bhikkhu Bodhi, the "elimination of craving culminates not only in the extinction of sorrow, anguish and distress, but in the unconditioned freedom of nibbana, which is won with the ending of repeated rebirth."

According to Spiro, most (lay) Theravada Buddhists do not aspire for nirvana and total extinction, but for a pleasurable rebirth in heaven. According to Spiro, this presents a "serious conflict" since the Buddhist texts and teaching "describe life as suffering and hold up nirvana as the summum bonum." In response to this deviation, "monks and others emphasize that the hope for nirvana is the only legitimate action for Buddhist action." Nevertheless, according to Spiro most Burmese lay Buddhists do not aspire for the extinction of existence which is nirvana.

According to B.R. Ambedkar, the Indian Buddhist Dalit leader, the four truths were not part of the original teachings of the Buddha, but a later aggregation, due to Hindu influences. According to Ambedkar, total cessation of suffering is an illusion; yet, the Buddhist Middle Path aims at the reduction of suffering and the maximizing of happiness, balancing both sorrow and happiness.

Mahayana
The four truths are less prominent in the Mahayana traditions, which emphasize insight into Śūnyatā and the Bodhisattva path as a central elements in their teachings. If the sutras in general are studied at all, it is through various Mahayana commentaries.

According to Makransky the Mahayana Bodhisattva ideal created tensions in the explanation of the four truths. In the Mahayana view, a fully enlightened Buddha does not leave samsara, but remains in the world out of compassion for all sentient beings. The four truths, which aim at ending samsara, do not provide a doctrinal basis for this view, and had to be reinterpreted. In the old view, klesas and karma are the cause of prolonged existence. According to Makransky, "[t]o remove those causes was, at physical death, to extinguish one's conditioned existence, hence to end forever one's participation in the world (Third Truth)." According to Makransky, the question of how a liberated being can still be "pervasively operative in this world" has been "a seminal source of ongoing doctrinal tension over Buddhahood throughout the history of the Mahayana in India and Tibet."

Tibetan Buddhism
Atisha, in his Bodhipathapradīpa ("A Lamp for the Path to Awakening"), which forms the basis for the Lamrim tradition, discerns three levels of motivation for Buddhist practitioners. At the beginning level of motivation, one strives toward a better life in samsara. At the intermediate level, one strives to a liberation from existence in samsara and the end of all suffering. At the highest level of motivation, one strives after the liberation  of all living beings. In his commentary on the text, Tsenshap Serkong Rinpoche explains that the four truths are to be meditated upon as a means of practice for the intermediate level.

According to Geshe Tashi Tsering, within Tibetan Buddhism, the four noble truths are studied as part of the Bodhisattva path. They are explained in Mahayana commentaries such as the Abhisamayalamkara, a summary of and commentary on the Prajna Paramita sutras, where they form part of the lower Hinayana teachings. The truth of the path (the fourth truth) is traditionally presented according to a progressive formula of five paths, rather than as the eightfold path presented in Theravada. According to Tsering, the study of the four truths is combined with the study of the sixteen characteristics of the four noble truths.

Some contemporary Tibetan Buddhist teachers have provided commentary on the Dhammacakkappavattana Sutta and the noble eightfold path when presenting the dharma to Western students.

Nichiren Buddhism
Nichiren Buddhism is based on the teaching of the Japanese priest and teacher Nichiren, who believed that the Lotus Sūtra contained the essence of all of Gautama Buddha's teachings. The third chapter of the Lotus Sutra states that the Four Noble Truths was the early teaching of the Buddha, while the Dharma of the Lotus is the "most wonderful, unsurpassed great Dharma". The teachings on the four noble truths are a provisional teaching, which Shakyamuni Buddha taught according to the people’s capacity, while the Lotus Sutra is a direct statement of Shakyamuni’s own enlightenment.

Western Buddhism
For many western Buddhists, the rebirth doctrine in the Four Noble Truths teaching is a problematic notion. According to Lamb, "Certain forms of modern western Buddhism [...] see it as purely mythical and thus a dispensable notion." According to Coleman, the focus of most vipassana students in the west "is mainly on meditation practice and a kind of down-to-earth psychological wisdom." According to Damien Keown, westerners find "the ideas of karma and rebirth puzzling." According to Gowans, many Western followers and people interested in exploring Buddhism are skeptical and object to the belief in karma and rebirth foundational to the Four Noble Truths. According to Konik,

 
According to Keown, it is possible to reinterpret the Buddhist doctrines such as the Four Noble Truths, since the final goal and the answer to the problem of suffering is nirvana, and not rebirth. Some Western interpreters have proposed what is sometimes referred to as "naturalized Buddhism". It is devoid of rebirth, karma, nirvana, realms of existence, and other concepts of Buddhism, with doctrines such as the Four Noble Truths reformulated and restated in modernistic terms. This "deflated secular Buddhism" stresses compassion, impermanence, causality, selfless persons, no Boddhisattvas, no nirvana, no rebirth, and a naturalist's approach to well-being of oneself and others.

According to Melford Spiro, this approach undermines the Four Noble Truths, for it does not address the existential question for the Buddhist as to "why live? why not commit suicide, hasten the end of dukkha in current life by ending life". In traditional Buddhism, rebirth continues the dukkha and the path to cessation of dukkha isn't suicide, but the fourth reality of the Four Noble Truths. The "naturalized Buddhism", according to Gowans, is a radical revision to traditional Buddhist thought and practice, and it attacks the structure behind the hopes, needs and rationalization of the realities of human life to traditional Buddhists in East, Southeast and South Asia. According to Keown, it may not be necessary to believe in some of the core Buddhist doctrines to be a Buddhist, but the rebirth, karma, realms of existence and cyclic universe doctrines underpin the Four Noble Truths in Buddhism.

Traditional Buddhist scholars disagree with these modernist Western interpretations. Bhikkhu Bodhi, for example, states that rebirth is an integral part of the Buddhist teachings as found in the sutras, despite the problems that "modernist interpreters of Buddhism" seem to have with it. Thanissaro Bhikkhu, as another example, rejects the "modern argument" that "one can still obtain all the results of the practice without having to accept the possibility of rebirth." He states, "rebirth has always been a central teaching in the Buddhist tradition."

According to Owen Flanagan, the Dalai Lama states that "Buddhists believe in rebirth" and that this belief has been common among his followers. However, the Dalai Lama's belief, adds Flanagan, is more sophisticated than ordinary Buddhists, because it is not the same as reincarnation—rebirth in Buddhism is envisioned as happening without the assumption of an "atman, self, soul", but rather through a "consciousness conceived along the anatman lines". The doctrine of rebirth is considered mandatory in Tibetan Buddhism, and across many Buddhist sects.

According to Christopher Gowans, for "most ordinary Buddhists, today as well as in the past, their basic moral orientation is governed by belief in karma and rebirth". Buddhist morality hinges on the hope of well being in this lifetime or in future rebirths, with nirvana (enlightenment) a project for a future lifetime. A denial of karma and rebirth undermines their history, moral orientation and religious foundations. According to Keown, most Buddhists in Asia do accept these traditional teachings, and seek better rebirth.

Navayana Buddhism
The Navayana, a modernistic interpretation of Buddhism by the Indian leader and Buddhist scholar B. R. Ambedkar, rejected much of traditional Buddhism, including the Four Noble Truths, karma and rebirth, thus turning his new religion into a vehicle for class struggle and social action. According to Ambedkar, Four Noble Truths was "the invention of wrong-headed monks".

See also
 List of Buddhist topics
 Buddhist paths to liberation
 Dependent Origination
 Noble Eightfold Path
 Pariyatti
 Three marks of existence

Notes

References

Sources

Printed sources

Sutta Pitaka

 
 
  (See also Anguttara Nikaya)
 
 

Buddhist teachers

 
 

 
 
 
 

 

 
 
 
 

 

 
 
 
 
 

 

 
 

 

 

 

 
 
 

 
 
 
 

Scholarly sources

 
 
 
 
 
 
 
 

 
 
 
 
 
 
 
 

 
 
 
 
 
 
 

 

 
 
 

 
 
 
 
 

 
 
 
 
 
 
 
 

 
 
 
 
 
 
 

 

 
 
 
 
 
 
 

 
 
 
 
 
 

 
 
 
 
 
 

 
 

 
 

 
 

 
 
 
 
 
 
 
 
 

 
 

 

 
 
 
 
 
 
 

Web sources

Further reading

Historical background and development
 
 , chapter 8
 

Theravada commentaries
 Walpola Rahula (1974), What the Buddha Taught, Grove Press
 Ajahn Sucitto (2010), Turning the Wheel of Truth: Commentary on the Buddha's First Teaching, Shambhala.
 Ajahn Sumedho (2002), [https://web.archive.org/web/20150325013823/http://www.buddhanet.net/pdf_file/4nobltru.pdf The Four Noble Truths, Amaravati Publications.
 Bhikkhu Bodhi (2006), The Noble Eightfold Path: Way to the End of Suffering, Pariyatti Publishing.

Tibetan Buddhism
 Chögyam Trungpa (2009), The Truth of Suffering and the Path of Liberation, Shambhala.
 Dalai Lama (1998), The Four Noble Truths, Thorsons.
 Geshe Tashi Tsering (2005), The Four Noble Truths: The Foundation of Buddhist Thought, Volume I, Wisdom, Kindle Edition
 Ringu Tulku (2005), Daring Steps Toward Fearlessness: The Three Vehicles of Tibetan Buddhism, Snow Lion. (Part 1 of 3 is a commentary on the four truths)

Modern interpretations
 
 Epstein, Mark (2004), Thoughts Without A Thinker: Psychotherapy from a Buddhist Perspective. Basic Books. Kindle Edition. (Part 1 examines the four truths from a Western psychological perspective)
 Moffitt, Phillip (2008), Dancing with Life: Buddhist Insights for Finding Meaning and Joy in the Face of Suffering, Rodale, Kindle Edition. (An explanation of how to apply the Four Noble Truths to daily life)
 Thich Nhat Hanh (1999), The Heart of the Buddha's Teaching, Three Rivers Press

Other scholarly explanations
 Gethin, Rupert (1998), Foundations of Buddhism, Oxford University Press (Chapter 3 is a commentary of about 25 pages).
 Lopez, Donald S. (2001), The Story of Buddhism, HarperCollins (pp. 42–54).

External links

 " What are the Four Noble Truths?"
 " The Four Noble Truths: an overview", Berzin Archives
 The Four Noble Truths. A Study Guide, Thanissaro Bikkhu
Four Noble Truths, Rigpa Wiki

Buddhist philosophical concepts
4 Four Noble Truths